Langside Synagogue is a synagogue near Govanhill in Glasgow. It opened in May 1927 and closed in 2014.

History

Construction began in 1926 and it opened in May 1927. It was designed by Waddell & Young and its interior was designed by Harris Berkowitch. It was one of the only purpose-built synagogues in Scotland and one of two synagogues of Eastern European style in the United Kingdom. The interior has folk art-style features including woodcarvings and wall-paintings which are similar to synagogues in Romania, Poland, and Ukraine, reflecting the Eastern European heritage of the synagogue's membership. It is also one of a few synagogues in Glasgow to have survived since the interwar period.

It closed in 2014 and was sold in 2019. Some of the interior decoration, including the ark and bimah, were removed after the building closed and went to the Scottish Jewish Archives Centre in Garnethill.

Following an "overwhelming" and "unprecedented" campaign of support, it was made a Category C listed building on 14 September 2020. The features which were considered as significant were the mainly unaltered exterior, the Eastern European design which is rare in the United Kingdom, the fact that it was one of the only purpose-built synagogues in Scotland and the contribution it has to the study of the early 20th-century Jewish community in Glasgow. The single-story addition at the back of the building was not included in the listed designation.

There is a resurgent local Jewish community who have expressed interest in re-opening the synagogue for services and as a community centre for Govanhill.

References

1926 establishments in Scotland
2014 disestablishments in Scotland
Ashkenazi Jewish culture in England
Ashkenazi synagogues
Category C listed buildings in Glasgow
Polish-Jewish culture in the United Kingdom
Romanian-Jewish diaspora
Russian-Jewish diaspora in Europe
Synagogues completed in 1927
Synagogues in Glasgow
Ukrainian-Jewish diaspora
Govanhill and Crosshill